The We Meaning You Tour was the third concert tour by Australian recording artist, Sia. The tour was launched in support of her fifth studio album, We Are Born (2010). The tour performed shows in North America, Europe and Australasia. The concert at the Roundhouse was recorded and release through Concert Live.

Background
The first show in Vancouver was cut short when the singer suffered from heat exhaustion, and left the stage after an aborted rendition of "Be Good to Me".

Critical reception
The setlist featured a selection of new songs from the album set for a June release, such as "Clap Your Hands" and older tracks. It also included the covers "Oh Father" and "I Go to Sleep". The performance of "I Go To Sleep" during the Portland show was described as "swirling, and gently smoldering, something that allowed Sia to let her voice to shine in all its glory".

A review of the opening night of the European tour remarked that the "actual musical performance [was] decidedly fantastic" while noting the song "Breathe Me" which had been used in prolific advert for the company Nykredit. A reviewer of the well-attended concert in Brussels found a well-balanced setlist and praised the vocal gymnastics, while technical issues resulted in a muted performance in Utrecht.

Personnel
Band
Guitar: Tim Vanderkuil 
Bass: Sam Dixon
Keyboards: Joe Kennedy
Drums: Felix Bloxsom

Opening acts
Body Language 
Girl in a Coma 
Dance Yourself to Death 
RebekkaMaria

Setlist
The following setlist was obtained from the concert held on 15 May 2010, at L'Aéronef in Lille, France. It does not represent all concerts for the duration of the tour. 
"The Fight"
"Buttons"
"Big Girl Little Girl"
"Little Black Sandals"
"Oh Father"
"You've Changed"
"Lentil"
"Never Gonna Leave Me"
"The Girl You Lost to Cocaine"
"I Go to Sleep"
"Cloud"
"Clap Your Hands"
"You Have Been Loved"
"Breathe Me"
Encore
"Sunday"
"Soon We'll Be Found"

Tour dates

Festivals and other miscellaneous performances
This concert was a part of the "Coachella Valley Music and Arts Festival"
This concert was a part of "Big Day Out"

Cancellations and rescheduled shows

Box office score data

External links 
 Excerpt from the Brussels performance provided by RTBF.

References

2010 concert tours
2011 concert tours
Sia (musician)